Clarita may refer to:

Clarita, Oklahoma, United States
Clarita Carlos, political analyst and academician in the Philippines
Clarita de Quiroz (born 1984), Scottish singer, songwriter, and model

See also
Santa Clarita (disambiguation)